The Theoretical Advanced Study Institute or TASI is a four-week summer school in high-energy physics or astrophysics held yearly at the University of Colorado at Boulder.  The school is meant primarily for advanced graduate students and consists of a series of pedagogical lectures on selected topics given by active researchers in the field.  TASI is the most common summer school attended by high-energy physics graduate students in the United States.

Writeups of the TASI lectures are traditionally collected into a published volume each year, creating a valuable resource for students hoping to learn about current research topics in an accessible way. The writeups are typically also posted by the lecturers on arXiv.org, providing freely-accessible web-based sources on various physics topics.  Since 2007, TASI has also posted video recordings of the lectures online.

Recent TASI schools

History
The first TASI was held in 1984 at the University of Michigan.  Subsequent TASIs were held at Yale (1985), Santa Cruz (1986), Santa Fe (1987), and Brown (1988).  Since 1989 TASI has been located in Boulder.

External links
Theoretical Advanced Study Institute in Elementary Particle Physics (TASI) 
TASI lecture writeups on INSPIRE-HEP
TASI Lectures on strings, branes, M-theory, quantum gravity, and related topics

University of Colorado Boulder
Physics education